Stephan Kling (born 22 March 1981) is a German former professional footballer who played as a defender. He is a product of Bayern Munich's youth system, and has represented Germany at under-21 level.

Honours
Hamburger SV
DFL-Ligapokal: 2003

References

External links
 

1981 births
Living people
People from Dachau
Sportspeople from Upper Bavaria
German footballers
Footballers from Bavaria
Association football defenders
Germany youth international footballers
Germany under-21 international footballers
Germany B international footballers
Bundesliga players
2. Bundesliga players
Austrian Football Bundesliga players
FC Bayern Munich footballers
FC Bayern Munich II players
Hamburger SV players
Hamburger SV II players
1. FC Saarbrücken players
SC Rheindorf Altach players
Sportfreunde Lotte players
German expatriate footballers
German expatriate sportspeople in Austria
Expatriate footballers in Austria